Renan Paulino de Souza (born 15 February 1995), known as Renan Paulino or simply Renan, is a Brazilian footballer who plays in the position of midfielder. He has spent most of his career playing for a number of South American teams, especially Portuguesa. Currently, the plays for the Lithuanian club Banga, in the league A Lyga.

Club career
Born in the city of São Paulo, Renan began his professional football career by joining the team Associação Portuguesa de Desportos (also called Portuguesa), making his debut on 22 August 2013 where he started in a 1–2 home loss against Bahia, for that year's Copa Sudamericana. While it was his first appearance of the year, his side was ultimately relegated out of Série A. Renan was later promoted to his team's main squad in 2014, and became a regular starter in the year's Campeonato Paulista. On 24 May he scored his first professional goal, netting the last in a 2–0 home win against Atlético Goianiense for the Série B championship. Overall, Renan appeared in 17 league matches during 2014, though Portuguesa suffered another relegation. On 17 August 2015, he signed a three-year contract with Atlético Paranaense, after being previously on trial at the club. On 14 December 2015, Renan was loaned to Ferroviária, until the end of 2016 Campeonato Paulista. After returning from loan, he made his top tier debut on 21 August 2016, starting in a 0–1 away loss against Atlético Mineiro.

FK Banga 
In January 2022 he signed with the Lithuanian club FK Banga Gargždai (Banga), which is part of the league A Lyga. It was the first time playing in Europe.

References

External links

1995 births
Living people
Footballers from São Paulo
Brazilian footballers
Association football midfielders
Campeonato Brasileiro Série A players
Campeonato Brasileiro Série B players
Campeonato Brasileiro Série C players
Associação Portuguesa de Desportos players
Club Athletico Paranaense players
Associação Ferroviária de Esportes players
Clube Náutico Capibaribe players
Maringá Futebol Clube players
Clube Atlético Bragantino players
Anápolis Futebol Clube players
Esporte Clube Água Santa players